
Gmina Suchy Las is a rural gmina (administrative district) in Poznań County, Greater Poland Voivodeship, in west-central Poland. Its seat is the village of Suchy Las, which lies to the immediate north of the city of Poznań.

Villages
Gmina Suchy Las contains the villages and settlements of Biedrusko, Chludowo, Golęczewo, Suchy Las, Zielątkowo, Złotkowo and Złotniki. It also contains the former villages of Chojnica, Glinienko, Glinno, Knyszyna, Łagiewniki, Okalewo, Trzuskotowo and Tworkowo, now uninhabited, which lie within the area of the military training area centred on Biedrusko.

Neighbouring gminas
Gmina Suchy Las is bordered by the city of Poznań and by the gminas of Czerwonak, Murowana Goślina, Oborniki and Rokietnica.

References
Polish official population figures 2006

Suchy Las
Poznań County